The 2017 All-Japan Rugby Football Championship (日本ラグビーフットボール選手権大会 Nihon Ragubi-Futtobo-ru Senshuken Taikai) took place from 21–29 January 2017.

Qualifying

Top League
The 2016–17 Top League top three teams, Suntory Sungoliath, Panasonic Wild Knights and Yamaha Júbilo, gained entry to the Championship semi-finals.

University 
In the 53rd Japan National University Rugby Championship final Teikyo University defeated Tokai University 33–26 to secure the fourth berth in the Championship semi-finals.

Semifinals

Final

See also 
 All-Japan Rugby Football Championship
 Rugby Union in Japan

References

External links 
 Scores and details, Rugby Japan

All
All-Japan Rugby Football Championship